Mark Platts may refer to:

 Mark Platts (footballer) (born 1979), English football midfielder
 Mark de Bretton Platts (born 1947), moral philosopher

See also
Marc Platt (disambiguation)